Clarke County High School may refer to:

Clarke County High School (Alabama), Grove Hill, Alabama
Clarke County High School (Berryville, Virginia), Berryville, Virginia

See also
Clark County High School (disambiguation)
Clarke High School (disambiguation)